Isaac Adams (April 19, 1825 – September 28, 1879) was an American farmer and politician.

Born in Vernon, New York, Adams moved to Wisconsin in 1853 and settled in Door Creek, Wisconsin, in the town of Cottage Grove in Dane County, Wisconsin, where he was a farmer. He served as a justice of the peace for the town and was an enrolling officer during the American Civil War. Adams served in the Wisconsin State Assembly in 1867 and 1875 as a Republican. He died at his home in Cottage Grove, Wisconsin.

References

External links

1825 births
1879 deaths
People from Vernon, New York
People from Cottage Grove, Wisconsin
People of Wisconsin in the American Civil War
Republican Party members of the Wisconsin State Assembly
19th-century American politicians